Q-Bec My Love is a Canadian film, directed by Jean Pierre Lefebvre and released in 1970. A satirical allegory for Quebec nationalism, the film is depicted in disconnected vignettes which portray the professional, sexual and romantic relationships of Q-Bec (Anne Lauriault) with her boss Peter Ottawa (Denis Payne), her husband Jean-Baptiste Bilingue (Jean-Pierre Cartier) and her lover Sam Washington (Larry Kent).

Production
Q-Bec My Love was filmed from 8 November to 12 November 1969, with a budget of $25,000.

Release
The film was released in Montreal on 12 March 1970, by Faroun Films and grossed $140,000 at the box office and $7,000 was given to Lefebvre.

Awards
The film was historically most noted for setting off a crisis in the Canadian Film Awards, when Lefebvre threatened to withdraw the film from the competition if the Ontario Censor Board did not withdraw its demand for the film's explicit sexuality to be edited. Several other filmmakers were also prepared to withdraw in solidarity, although provincial cabinet minister James Auld intervened to dissuade the board from insisting on the cuts. The film screening went ahead, but film directors from Quebec continued to perceive a systemic bias against them; in 1973, a number of Quebec filmmakers entirely boycotted the awards. This later protest resulted in the last-minute cancellation of the 1973 awards ceremony, with the winners announced only at a press conference, and the complete cancellation of the 1974 awards.

References

Works cited

External links

1970 films
Canadian political satire films
Films shot in Quebec
Films directed by Jean Pierre Lefebvre
Canadian sex comedy films
Films set in Quebec
Quebec nationalism
1970s French-language films
French-language Canadian films
1970s Canadian films